Prim is a given name. Notable people with the name include:

Prim Intawong (born 1970), Thai volleyball player
Prim Lyza (born 1993), Cambodian actress
Prim Pujals (born 1943), Dominican politician
Prim Siripipat (born 1981), Thai former tennis player and sports anchor

See also
Prim (surname)